Luis Alberto Cubilla Almeida (28 March 1940 – 3 March 2013) was a Uruguayan football player and coach. He had a successful playing career winning 16 major titles. He then went on to become one of the most successful managers in South American football with 17 major titles.

Early career
Also known as "El Negro", Cubilla was born in Paysandú and started his playing career in the youth team of Colón de Paysandú. In 1957 he joined Peñarol where he was part of the team that won four Uruguayan league championships, two Copa Libertadores and a Copa Intercontinental.

Career highlights
In 1962 he joined FC Barcelona of Spain, where he was part of the team that won the Copa del Rey in 1963. He played 49 games and scored 12 goals with Barça.

Cubilla returned to South America in 1964 to play for River Plate of Argentina. In 1969, he returned to Uruguay joining Nacional where he won 4 more Uruguayan league titles, another Copa Libertadores, a Copa Interamericana and another Copa Intercontinental.

In the last years of his career he played for Santiago Morning of Chile and Defensor Sporting of Uruguay where he helped the club to win their first league championship and break the complete dominance of the league by Peñarol and Nacional.

Between 1959 and 1974 Cubilla played 38 games for the Uruguay national team in which he scored 11 goals. He played in three World Cups in 1962, 1970 and 1974.

Managerial career
As a coach, Cubilla achieved enormous success with Olimpia Asunción of Paraguay, winning 7 international titles and several national championships. He also coached Nacional, Peñarol, Defensor Sporting, Danubio (all of Uruguay), Atlético Nacional of Colombia, Newell's Old Boys and River Plate of Argentina and Cerro Porteño and Club Libertad, both from Paraguay.

Between 1991–1993 Luis Cubilla was the head coach of the Uruguay National Team and worked together with his older brother Pedro Cubilla as his assistant coach and Alejandro Riccino as the physical trainer.

During 1994 he coached the famous Argentinean club Racing Club de Avellaneda.

In February 2007, Cubilla signed with the Ecuadorian team Barcelona de Guayaquil.

In 2010, he returned once again as a coach for Olimpia Asunción of Paraguay. He died, aged 72, in Asunción.

Honours

As a player

Peñarol
 Uruguayan Primera División: 1958, 1959, 1960, 1961
 Copa Libertadores: 1960, 1961
 Intercontinental Cup: 1961

Barcelona
 Copa del Rey: 1962–63

Nacional
 Uruguayan Primera División: 1969, 1970, 1971, 1972
 Copa Libertadores: 1971
 Intercontinental Cup: 1971
 Copa Interamericana: 1972

Defensor
 Uruguayan Primera División: 1976

As a manager

Olimpia Asunción
 Paraguayan Primera División: 1979, 1982, 1988, 1989, 1995, 1997, 1998, 1999
 Copa Libertadores: 1979, 1990
 Copa Interamericana: 1979
 Intercontinental Cup: 1979
 Supercopa Libertadores: 1990
 Recopa Sudamericana: 1990, 2003

Peñarol
 Uruguayan Primera División: 1981

References

1940 births
2013 deaths
Footballers from Paysandú
Peñarol players
FC Barcelona players
Club Nacional de Football players
La Liga players
1962 FIFA World Cup players
1970 FIFA World Cup players
1974 FIFA World Cup players
Uruguayan footballers
Club Atlético River Plate footballers
Uruguay international footballers
Defensor Sporting managers
Uruguayan Primera División players
Defensor Sporting players
Chilean Primera División players
Santiago Morning footballers
Argentine Primera División players
Copa Libertadores-winning players
Uruguayan expatriate footballers
Expatriate footballers in Argentina
Expatriate footballers in Chile
Expatriate footballers in Spain
Uruguayan expatriate sportspeople in Argentina
Uruguayan expatriate sportspeople in Chile
Uruguayan expatriate sportspeople in Spain
1991 Copa América managers
1993 Copa América managers
Atlético Nacional managers
Barcelona S.C. managers
Peñarol managers
Club Olimpia managers
Danubio F.C. managers
C.D. Olimpia managers
Newell's Old Boys managers
Racing Club de Avellaneda managers
Club Atlético River Plate managers
Talleres de Córdoba managers
Comunicaciones F.C. managers
Club Tacuary managers
Uruguayan football managers
Uruguay national football team managers
Expatriate football managers in Argentina
Expatriate football managers in Colombia
Expatriate football managers in Ecuador
Expatriate football managers in Guatemala
Expatriate football managers in Paraguay
Expatriate football managers in Peru
Association football forwards
Club Guaraní managers